The 1991–92 Copa México is the 64th staging of the Copa México, and the 37th in the professional era.

The competition started on August 9, 1991, and concluded on September 8, 1991, with the Final, in which Monterrey lifted the trophy for first time ever with a 4-2 victory over Cobras.

For this edition was played by 20 teams, first played a group stage, later a knock-out stage.

Group stage
Group 1

Results

Group 2

Results

Group 3

Results

Group 4

Results

Group 5

Results

Final stage

Quarterfinals

Monterrey Advanced won 3-2 in Penalty kick

Semifinal

Cd. Juárez go to the final won 5-3 in penalty

Final

References
Mexico - Statistics of Copa México for the 1991–92 season. (RSSSF)

Copa MX
Cup
1991–92 domestic association football cups